Dalal Khalifa(دلال خليفة) is a Qatari novelist and playwright.

With her sister, Shu'a', Khalifa was one of the first writers in Qatar to publish novels. She has also written plays, publishing three together in one volume, Insan fi hayz al-wujud (A Person in the Sphere of Existence), in 1995. A native of Doha, she received her bachelor's degree in English from Qatar University and is possessed of a master's degree in translation from Heriot-Watt University. At one time head of the Foreign Publications Unit, she also led the women's cultural forum Marasina.

References

Living people
Qatari novelists
Qatari dramatists and playwrights
Qatari women writers
Women novelists
Women dramatists and playwrights
20th-century novelists
20th-century dramatists and playwrights
20th-century women writers
Qatar University alumni
Alumni of Heriot-Watt University
People from Doha
Year of birth missing (living people)